The fifth season of Adventure Time, an American animated television series created by Pendleton Ward, premiered on Cartoon Network on November 12, 2012 and concluded on March 17, 2014, and was produced by Frederator Studios and Cartoon Network Studios. The season follows the adventures of Finn, a human boy, and his best friend and adoptive brother Jake, a dog with magical powers to change shape and size at will. Finn and Jake live in the post-apocalyptic Land of Ooo, where they interact with the other main characters of the show: Princess Bubblegum, The Ice King, Marceline the Vampire Queen, Lumpy Space Princess, BMO, and Flame Princess.

This season comprises 52 episodes, making it twice the length of any of the show's previous seasons. The episodes were storyboarded and written by Tom Herpich, Jesse Moynihan, Cole Sanchez, Rebecca Sugar, Steve Wolfhard, Skyler Page, Somvilay Xayaphone, Ako Castuera, Michael DeForge, Kent Osborne, David OReilly, Ward, Graham Falk, Thomas Wellmann, Luke Pearson, Seo Kim, and Andy Ristaino. The season also featured OReilly and James Baxter as guest animators in the episodes "A Glitch is a Glitch" and "James Baxter the Horse," respectively. Furthermore, this was the last year of Adventure Time to feature Sugar and Page as they both left before the season ended to create their own shows. (Sugar with Steven Universe; Page with Clarence). It was also the final season to feature Ward as the showrunner.

The first episode of the fifth season was the two-parter episode "Finn the Human" / "Jake the Dog," both of which aired on November 12, 2012. 3.435 million viewers viewed the episode; this marked a dramatic increase from the previous season's premiere and finale. The season ended with "Billy's Bucket List," which was viewed by 2.335 million viewers.

The season was met with largely positive critical reception. In June 2013, the series was nominated for "Best Animated Series" at the 2013 Critics' Choice Television Awards, although it did not win. Both "Simon & Marcy" and "Be More" were nominated for Primetime Emmy Awards for Short-Format Animation at the 65th and 66th Primetime Emmy Awards respectively. Former character designer Andy Ristaino and series' art director Nick Jennings both won Emmys for "Outstanding Individual Achievement In Animation" in 2013 and 2014, respectively. In addition, several compilation DVDs that contained episodes from the season have been released. The complete season set was released on DVD and Blu-ray on July 14, 2015.

Development

Concept
The season follows the adventures of Finn the Human, a human boy, and his best friend Jake, a dog with magical powers to change shape and grow and shrink at will. Finn and Jake live in the post-apocalyptic Land of Ooo, wherein they interact with the other major characters, including Princess Bubblegum, The Ice King, Marceline the Vampire Queen, Lumpy Space Princess, BMO, and Flame Princess. Common storylines revolve around Finn and Jake discovering strange creatures, dealing with the antagonistic but misunderstood Ice King, and battling monsters to help others. Multi-episode storylines for this season include Finn's relationship with and eventual breakup with Flame Princess, Lemongrab's descent into tyranny, and Finn and Jake's attempt to prevent the Lich from destroying all life in the multiverse. The season ends on a cliffhanger, with the revelation that Finn's father is still alive.

Production

On October 12, 2012, it was announced that Cartoon Network had officially renewed Adventure Time for a fifth season. The episode titles were released on November 2, 2012 by Frederator Studios, while the show had just reached the end of its fourth season. Based on production numbers, "Finn the Human" was the first episode that underwent production, and it was also the first episode aired. The season contains 52 episodes, twice the normal number of episodes per season. Both Frederator and storyboard artist Jesse Moynihan explained that originally, a four-part special was supposed to divide the season in half, but that the special was pushed off, and later cancelled. However, some elements of the planned special were later used in the show's sixth season's episode "Something Big". In production, the first half of the season was referred to as season 5.1, and the second half was referred to as 5.2.

This season's episodes were produced in a process similar to those of the previous seasons. Each episode was outlined in two-to-three pages that contained the necessary plot information. These outlines were then handed to storyboard artists, who created full storyboards. Design and coloring were done at Cartoon Network Studios in Burbank, California, and animation was handled overseas in South Korea by Rough Draft Korea and Saerom Animation. Although almost all of the episodes are hand-animated, the fifteenth episode, "A Glitch Is a Glitch", was created by guest animator David OReilly in his signature 3-D animation. According to Adam Muto, OReilly was brought on board after Ward expressed an interest in letting him helm an episode. Initially, the producers had wanted OReilly to appear in earlier seasons, but the network was hesitant to bring in guest directors. Eventually, the network relented, and he was finally approved to appear in the fifth season. British animator James Baxter guest animated the horse featured in the episode "James Baxter the Horse". For the first half of the season, the writers room was largely composed of Ward, Kent Osborne, and Pat McHale. McHale eventually left the series to create Over the Garden Wall, and Jack Pendarvis and the newly promoted Muto and were brought on board to pen story outlines.

The season was storyboarded and written by Tom Herpich, Moynihan, Cole Sanchez, Sugar, Steve Wolfhard, Skyler Page, Somvilay Xayaphone, Castuera, Michael DeForge, Osborne, OReilly, Ward, Graham Falk, Thomas Wellmann, Luke Pearson, Seo Kim, and Ristaino. "Little Dude" was the first entry in the series to have been storyboarded by prop and character designer DeForge. He wrote on his official Tumblr that, "Cole and Adam Muto basically held my hand through the whole process, and were both incredibly patient with me." Starting with "Love Games", Ristaino was promoted from lead character designer to storyboard artist. Guest artist Falk, creator of the animated series Untalkative Bunny, storyboarded the episodes "Shh!" and "Root Beer Guy". The former was dedicated to Armen Mirzaian who was a storyboard artist for earlier episodes in the series. Mirzaian died in a car accident on February 21, 2013 at the age of 35. Regular storyboarder Castuera had to take off two storyboard rotations due to an art show, and so her partner, Moynihan, worked with German cartoonist Wellmann on "The Suitor" and "Wizards Only, Fools"; the two co-operated on their storyboards via Skype and Google+ Hangout. Pearson was paired with Xayaphone for both the episodes "Candy Streets" and "Frost & Fire"; however, this pairing was only temporary, and Xayaphone boarded the rest of the season with Kim. This season was the last to feature Page and Sugar. Page left after completing "Davey" to create his own series Clarence. Sugar left the series after storyboarding the episode "Simon & Marcy" to focus her attention on her own Cartoon Network series, Steven Universe.

The episode "All Your Fault" was the last regular episode of the season to feature a "directed by" credit. The subsequent episode, "Little Dude", only credited Muto as "supervising director" and Nick Jennings as "art director". Muto later explained that, "No one currently gets the 'directed by' credit." Both Muto and Nate Cash had, in previous episodes, been credited as creative directors, but according to Muto, the series decided to phase the title out in favor of "supervising director". For the first half of the season, both Muto and Cash took turns holding the supervising director credit on different episodes. Starting with "Shh!", however, Elizabeth Ito, a former storyboard artist for the show in season one, returned to the series and was also credited as supervising director in place of Muto. "Bad Little Boy", the season's eleventh episode, however, still had a "directed by" credit. This is due to the fact that the episode was produced before "Little Dude", but aired out of order. "A Glitch Is a Glitch" also featured a "directed by" credit, but this is due to the fact that the episode's director, OReilly, was a guest animator and director for the series.

In an interview with Rolling Stone, Ward revealed that he stepped down as series showrunner sometime during this season in favor of Muto. He explained that, as a naturally introverted person, he found it extremely exhausting having to deal with people every day. With that being said, Ward remained working on the series as a storyboard artist and storyline writer, and every single fifth-season episode (with the exception of "A Glitch is a Glitch") featured story input by Ward.

Cast
The voice actors for the season include: Jeremy Shada (Finn the Human), John DiMaggio (Jake the Dog), Tom Kenny (The Ice King), Hynden Walch (Princess Bubblegum), and Olivia Olson (Marceline the Vampire Queen). Ward himself provides the voice for several minor characters, including Lumpy Space Princess. Former storyboard artist Niki Yang voices the sentient video game console BMO in English, as well as Jake's girlfriend Lady Rainicorn in Korean. Polly Lou Livingston, a friend of Pendleton Ward's mother, Bettie Ward, plays the voice of the small elephant Tree Trunks. Justin Roiland provides the voice of the Earl of Lemongrab. Jessica DiCicco voices Flame Princess, Finn's former romantic interest. The season's first few episodes also feature The Lich, the series principal antagonist. The Lich is portrayed by Ron Perlman. The Adventure Time cast records their lines together as opposed to doing it individually. This is to capture more natural sounding dialogue among the characters. Hynden Walch has described these group session as akin to "doing a play reading—a really, really out there play."

Several voices actors and actresses reprise their characters in this season. Emo Philips reprises his fourth season character Cuber in both "Five More Short Graybles" and "Another Five Short Graybles". Andy Milonakis reprises his role as N.E.P.T.R. in "Mystery Dungeon". "Bad Little Boy" features Neil Patrick Harris returning as Prince Gumball, Madeleine Martin reprising the role of Fionna, and Roz Ryan reappearing as Cake. Keith David once again voices the Flame King in "Vault of Bones", "Earth & Water", and "The Red Throne". Davey Johnson reappears as the goblin king Xergiok in "The Great Bird Man"; he also voices the titular character in the episode "Davey". "Davey" also features Randy Liedtke as a candy person named Randy. Steve Little, who plays the recurring role as Peppermint Butler, also reprises his role as Abracadaniel in "Wizards Only, Fools" and "Play Date". Maurice LaMarche reprises his role as Grand Master Wizard in both "Wizards Only, Fools" and "Betty". Musical parody artist "Weird Al" Yankovic reprises his role as Banana Man in "We Fixed a Truck". Noah Nelson reprises his role as Kee-Oth the demon in the two-parter "Play Date" and "The Pit", having first appeared in the third-season episode "Dad's Dungeon". Osborne reprises his recurring role as Finn and Jake's dad, Joshua, in the episode "The Pit". Ron Lynch returns to the series in "Apple Wedding", voicing Mr. Pig. Jeff Bennett reprises his role as Choose Goose in the episode "Blade of Grass", and also voices an alternate-universe version of the character named Choose Bruce in the episode "Finn the Human." Miguel Ferrer reprises his role as Death, and Steve Agee returns as Ash in "Betty". Both Lou Ferrigno, Andy Samberg, and Mark Hamill return in "Billy's Bucket List" as Billy, Party Pat, and the Fear Feaster, respectively.

The series also regularly employs guest voices for new characters. For instance, in the two-parter "Finn the Human" and "Jake the Dog", Ming-Na Wen voiced Farmworld Finn's mother (as she did in the season four cliffhanger "The Lich"), Kumail Nanjiani appeared as Prismo, and Cloris Leachman plays the role of Farmworld Marceline. Additionally, in "Jake the Dog" and "Frost & Fire", M. Emmet Walsh voices the Cosmic Owl. In "Up a Tree", Jim Cummings voices the Porcupine, Lenny the Beaver, and the Owl; and Marc Maron appears as the squirrel. Cummings would later reappear in the latter season episode "Candy Streets" playing a different character. In "Jake the Dad", Kristen Schaal lends her voice to Jake Jr. (she would reprise the role in the later episodes "One Last Job" and "Another Five Short Graybles"); Choe Dong-Hyun appears as T.V. and Kim Kil Whan; and Sunny Sandler voices both Charlie and Viola. In "Little Dude", Dana Snyder appears as the Ancient Sleeping Magi of Life Giving. With "Bad Little Boy", Donald Glover debuted as Marshall Lee, Marceline's male counterpart. In the episode "Puhoy", Jonathan Frakes voices a grown-up version of Finn, Mandy Siegfriend voices Roselinen, and Wallace Shawn voices an oracle. Levar Burton voices an anthropomorphic bubble in "BMO Lost". Baxter plays the eponymous character in the "James Baxter the Horse". Both Johnny Pemberton and James Adomian appear in the episode "The Suitor", voicing Braco and the demon-possessed Cinnamon Bun, respectively. Series storyboard artist Cole Sanchez voiced the Party God in "Shh!" and "Party's Over, Isla de Señorita"; Riki Lindhome portrayed the female island in the latter episode. The character Tiffany, who had first appeared in a minor role in the first season episode "My Two Favorite People", reappears in "One Last Job". In the first season, he was voiced by Vincenzo Rauso. However, in "One Last Job", he was voiced by Collin Dean. Comedian Melissa Villaseñor appears as Ann the pharmacist in "Candy Streets". Duncan Trussell appears as Ron James in "Wizards Only, Fools" and "Betty".

Dan Mintz appears as T.V. in "Jake Suit". Aziz Ansari, Paul F. Tompkins, and Chuck McCann appear in "Be More", as DMO, one of the SMOs, and Moe Giovanni, respectively. "Sky Witch" features Jill Talley, the wife of Kenny, voicing the eponymous sky witch, Maja. In "The Vault", Isabelle Fuhrman voices Shoko and Paul Scheer voices the Bath Boy Gang Boss. In "Love Games", Katie Crown voices Slime Princess's sister Blargatha, and John Hodgman appears as Elder Plops. Marina Sirtis voices the character Samantha in the episode "The Pit". In "James", Andy Merrill appears as the titular character. In the episode "Root Beer Guy", series' outline writer Jack Pendarvis lends his voice to the character of the same name, and Anne Heche voices the character's wife, Cherry Cream Soda. In addition, Make a Wish Foundation arranged for a 14-year-old named Christopher to be the voice of a background character in "Root Beer Guy". Andy Daly voices the King of Ooo in "Apple Wedding". Rainn Wilson voices the titular character in "Rattleballs". Roddy Piper plays the part of Don John in "The Red Throne". Lena Dunham appears as Betty in the episode of the same name. In "Lemonhope", actor and musician Creed Bratton voices the character Phlannel Boxingday, and Roiland voices the titular character. Series storyboard artist Ako Castuera voices Canyon in "Billy's Bucket List".

Various other characters are voiced by Tom Kenny, Dee Bradley Baker, Maria Bamford, Little, and Kent Osborne.

Broadcast and reception

Ratings

The season debuted on November 12, 2012, with the two-part episode "Finn the Human"/"Jake the Dog". Together, both episodes were watched by 3.435 million viewers. This marked a drastic increase of almost one million viewers when compared to the previous season premiere, as well as the previous season finale. The season opener was also the most-watched episode of the season. Aside from the season opener, "Jake the Dad", "Bad Little Boy", and "Frost & Fire" were the only other episodes of the season to garner over 3 million viewers, and they were watched by 3.19, 3.077, and 3.009 million viewers, respectively. On March 29, 2013, it was reported that the show averaged roughly 2 to 3 million viewers per episode. The season concluded with "Billy's Bucket List" on March 17, 2014. The episode was viewed by 2.335 million viewers, marking a slight decrease in viewers when compared to the season four finale "The Lich" which was viewed by 2.589 million viewers.

Reviews and accolades

Eric Kohn of IndieWire praised the beginning of the season for being "irreverent and narratively engaging". He called it "the ideal testament to animation's glorious pliability in an  commercial arena otherwise defined by restrictions." Kohn felt that the show's exploration of "sad subtext"—such as the series' mysterious Mushroom War and the relationship between Marceline and the Ice King—and the characters' abilities to "deny the bad vibes their surrounding world invites" via "cheery songs and vibrant artwork" were some of the series strongest points. He was particularly pleased with the season opener, calling it an "interesting creative challenge". Kohn later published an article explaining why "'Adventure Time' is the best Sci-Fi show on TV right now". He singled out "Simon & Marcy", praising the way in which the episode "deepen[ed] the world [of Ooo] in all kinds of morbidly fascinating ways." Furthermore, he compared the entry to Cormac McCarthy's book The Road, specifically citing the similarities between the mutant creatures in the episode and the "demented people" in the latter. Kohn ultimately concluded that the series' "willingness to contemplate [the themes of the episode] while sticking to its unique combination of silliness and haunting beauty routinely transforms the show into a wondrous genre experiment."

Oliver Sava of The A.V. Club wrote that the season was "experimental" in that the series' writers and storyboard artists "continue to experiment with what they can do in 10 minutes". He specifically cited the plots from the season openers, "All the Little People", and "Shh!" as examples, and applauded the fact that the series was willing to explore different styles of animation, such as in the installment "A Glitch is a Glitch". Rich Goldstein of The Daily Beast argued that the emotional depth of the series increased during this season, highlighting "Simon & Marcy" as an example. Emily Guendelsberger of The A.V. Club later awarded the entire season an "A", noting that "Adventure Time has somehow managed to stay on fire for its fifth season's double-wide 52-episode run." Guendelsberger praised the show's aforementioned creativity and experimentation, and also wrote that "the writing staff has also taken the less-obvious X-Files approach: expanding the length of the stories they're able to tell by linking monster-of-the-week episodes into longer arcs." The A.V. Club later named the series the 27th best television series of 2014, noting that, "The end of the super-sized season five saw a string of conceptually ambitious episodes that blew the world of Ooo wide open, deepening the stories of Lemongrab, Lumpy Space Princess' doomed romance, and Ice King's past as Simon Petrikov." The site selected "Lemonhope" as the stand-out from the season's end. Each episode was also graded by The A.V. Club with a different letter grade; the season received four C's, twenty B's, and twenty-six A's.

In June 2013, the series was nominated for "Best Animated Series" at the 2013 Critics' Choice Television Awards, although it lost to the FX series Archer. At the 65th Primetime Emmy Awards, "Simon & Marcy", was later nominated for a Primetime Emmy Award for Short-format Animation, and former character designer Andy Ristaino won an Emmy for "Outstanding Individual Achievement In Animation" for his character designs in the episode "Puhoy", making it the series' first Emmy win. The episode "Be More" was later nominated for a Primetime Emmy Award for Short-format Animation at the 66th Primetime Emmy Awards in 2014. On July 31, 2014, it was announced that series art director, Nick Jennings, had won an Emmy for "Outstanding Individual Achievement In Animation" for his work on the episode "Wizards Only, Fools".

Episodes

Home media
Warner Home Video released multiple DVD volumes, such as Jake the Dad, The Suitor, Princess Day, Finn the Human, Frost & Fire, and The Enchiridion which contain episodes from the fifth season. All DVD releases can be purchased on the Cartoon Network Shop, and the individual episodes can be downloaded from both the iTunes Store and Amazon.com.

Full season release
The full season set was released on DVD and Blu-ray on July 14, 2015.

Notes

References

2012 American television seasons
2013 American television seasons
2014 American television seasons
Adventure Time seasons